The Bee Gees Sing and Play 14 Barry Gibb Songs is the debut studio album by the Bee Gees. Credited to Barry Gibb and the Bee Gees, it was released in November 1965 on the Australian Leedon label (1967's Bee Gees' 1st would be their international debut album). It is a compilation of most of the Gibb brothers' singles that had been released over the previous three years in Australia, which accounts for the many different styles of music on it.

Recording
Only five new songs were recorded for the album: "I Was a Lover, a Leader of Men", "And the Children Laughing", "I Don't Think It's Funny", "How Love Was True" and "To Be or Not to Be". Barry had more than enough unrecorded songs for an all-new LP, but the rest of the album was instead made up of nine lesser-known singles. Bill Shepherd set the order of the songs.

Barry plays rhythm guitar, and Maurice probably plays the other guitars, like the leads in "I Was a Lover, a Leader of Men" and "How Love Was True"; whether Maurice managed to play the acoustic lead guitar in "I Don't Think It's Funny" or the fast piano in "To Be or Not to Be" is less certain, and the organ on "I Was a Lover, a Leader of Men" and "And the Children Laughing" is either Robin or Maurice. Though uncredited on the back of this album, it is confirmed that the Gibbs' friend Trevor Gordon played lead guitar on "Peace of Mind", "Wine and Women" and "Follow the Wind". Gordon later released several recordings under the name Trevor Gordon and the Bee Gees. Gordon went on to find success with Graham Bonnet in the UK-based duo the Marbles, who had a hit with "Only One Woman" written by the Bee Gees and produced by Barry and Maurice with Robert Stigwood.

Releases
The original issue of the LP on Leedon is extremely rare. Even the 1967 reissue on the Calendar label is rarely seen in Australia. This album package was not issued elsewhere and was not issued on CD until it was released as part of a 2013 box set, Festival Album Collection: 1965-1967.

Curiously, the "Bee Gees" are spelled with an apostrophe on the front cover, but not on the rear sleeve or labels – and unlike on any of their single releases.

Earlier tracks, like "Peace of Mind", "Claustrophobia" and "Could It Be", are in the beat vein that was popular throughout 1964, while later singles like "Follow the Wind" and "And the Children Laughing" reflect the more folky sounds of 1965. Of the new tracks that were recorded specifically for the album, "To Be or Not to Be" was probably the biggest departure, being a blues-based hard rocker. In the compilation Brilliant from Birth, "You Wouldn't Know" is faded early to 2:03, losing the shouting and laughing in the longer original fade.

Track listing

Personnel

Partial credits sourced from Joseph Brennan.
Bee Gees
Barry Gibb – lead, harmony and backing vocals; rhythm guitar
Robin Gibb – lead, harmony and backing vocals; Hammond organ on #1 (side 1) and #1 (side 2); #2, 7 (side 2); melodica on #6, 7 (side 1)
Maurice Gibb – harmony and backing vocals; lead guitar on #1, 3 (side 1) and #2, 6, 7 (side 2); rhythm guitar on #6, 7 (side 1); Hammond organ on #1 (side 1) and #1, 6 (side 2)

Additional musicians and production
 Bruce Davis, Leith Ryan – lead guitar on #6, 7 (side 1)
 Bill Swindells – bass guitar on #6, 7 (side 1)
 Laurie Wardman – drums on #6, 7 (side 1)
 Trevor Gordon – lead guitar on #2, 4, 7 (side 2)
 Uncredited musicians – bass guitar (except #5, 6, 7 (side 1) and #5 (side 2)); drums (except #6, 7 (side 1)); lead guitar and piano on #3, 4 (side 2); double bass, violin and piano on #5 (side 1) and #5 (side 2)

References

Bee Gees albums
1965 debut albums
Leedon Records albums